Lake Eyre is a lake in South Australia

Lake Eyre may also refer to.

Lake Eyre, South Australia, a locality
Lake Eyre Basin, a drainage basin terminating in Lake Eyre
Lake Eyre Important Bird Area
Lake Eyre National Park, a protected area - now called Kati Thanda-Lake Eyre National Park
Lake Eyre Yacht Club

See also
Eyre (disambiguation)
Eyre Creek (disambiguation)